Robert Renwick Mortimer (born 23 May 1959) is an English comedian and actor. He is known for his work with Vic Reeves as part of their Vic and Bob double act, and more recently the Mortimer & Whitehouse: Gone Fishing series with Paul Whitehouse. He has also appeared on panel shows such as Would I Lie to You? and Taskmaster.

Early life 
Robert Renwick Mortimer was born in Middlesbrough on 23 May 1959, and grew up with three brothers in the town's Linthorpe area. His father, a biscuit salesman, died in a car crash when Mortimer was seven. At around the same time, Mortimer accidentally burnt down his family's home with a stray firework. He attended King's Manor School in Middlesbrough, where his schoolmates included future sports presenter Ali Brownlee. A keen football fan, he had trials for local team Middlesbrough FC, but abandoned his footballing dreams due to early-onset arthritis.

Mortimer left school with three A-Levels and went on to study law at the University of Sussex and University of Leicester. There, he became involved in political causes and the punk movement, starting a band called Dog Dirt. After leaving university with an LLM in Welfare Law, he moved to London and became a solicitor for Southwark Council. He then moved to a private practice in Peckham, where his work with Public Health Act cases regarding cockroach infestations of council properties led to a local paper dubbing him "The Cockroach King". During this time, he was mugged by one of his clients, who stopped and apologised after recognising him; he continued to represent the client.

Career

Partnership with Vic Reeves 

In 1986, Mortimer went to the Goldsmith's Tavern in New Cross, London, to see a new show by the comedian Vic Reeves. Mortimer was impressed by the performance, particularly the character Tappy Lappy, which was Reeves attempting to tap dance while wearing a Bryan Ferry mask and planks on his feet. Mortimer approached Reeves after the show, and the two began writing material for the next week's show together. They also became good friends and formed a band, the Potter's Wheel. Mortimer began to perform on the show, which was christened Vic Reeves Big Night Out, creating such characters as the Singing Lawyer, Graham Lister, Judge Nutmeg and the Man With the Stick.

The show became successful in South London and eventually outgrew Goldsmith's Tavern, moving in 1988 to the Albany Empire in Deptford. Mortimer soon became an integral part of the performance, providing him with a weekly break from his legal work, which had begun to disillusion him.

Reeves and Mortimer made their television debut on the short-lived 1989 comedy chat show One Hour with Jonathan Ross, in the game show segment known as "Knock down ginger". Later that year, the duo made their first television pilot together, Vic Reeves Big Night Out. The television show remained true to the nightclub act's variety show format. Mortimer took a 10-week break from his legal job to film the series and never returned.

The two later created a one-off pilot for a sitcom called The Weekenders in 1992, followed by the sketch show The Smell of Reeves and Mortimer in 1993, and Shooting Stars, a comedy panel show that first aired in December 1993. After being commissioned, Shooting Stars ran for five series between 1995 and 2002, with a special anniversary edition broadcast in December 2008. A sixth series was broadcast in late 2009, followed by a seventh series in mid-2010, and an eighth in 2011.

In 1999, Reeves and Mortimer appeared in a second sketch show called Bang Bang, It's Reeves and Mortimer. A year later, Mortimer played the part of Jeff Randall in Randall & Hopkirk (Deceased), opposite Reeves as Marty Hopkirk and Emilia Fox as Jeannie Hurst.

In 2003, Mortimer and Reeves were listed in The Observer as one of the 50 funniest acts in British comedy. In a 2005 poll to find the Comedians' Comedian, the duo were voted the 9th greatest comedy act of all time by fellow comedians and comedy insiders.

In 2004, Mortimer and Reeves wrote and starred in Catterick, a six-episode surreal comedy about an ex-soldier, Carl, who returns home from serving in Cyprus to join his brother Chris, who has agreed to help find Carl's son. Cast included Reece Shearsmith, Matt Lucas, Morwenna Banks, Tim Healy, Mark Benton and Charlie Higson.

On 17 November 2007, Mortimer appeared as Reeves' hairdresser, Carl, in the weekly radio sketch show on BBC Radio 2 entitled Vic Reeves' House Arrest.

On 27 February 2008, Reeves announced that he and Mortimer were working together on a new sitcom about superheroes who get their powers through a malfunctioning telegraph pole.

In November 2013, Reeves and Mortimer filmed episodes of a new BBC sitcom, House of Fools, also featuring Matt Berry (as Beef), Morgana Robinson (as Julie), and Dan Skinner (as Bosh).

In October 2015 the pair cancelled the first leg of their live tour, 25 Year of Reeves and Mortimer: The Poignant Moments, after Mortimer underwent an emergency triple heart bypass.

On 29 December 2017, Mortimer and Reeves starred in a relaunch and new singular episode of their comedy Big Night Out for the BBC. The show has been remade and subsequently renamed to Vic and Bob's Big Night Out. The episode remained true to the classic Big Night Out formula and was composed of various comedy songs, skits, characters and sketches. This was the first time the Big Night Out series had featured Mortimer's name in the title. A full series of Vic and Bob's Big Night Out began on BBC Four in November 2018.

Solo career and appearances 
 In 1997, in collaboration with Chris Rea, Mortimer recorded Rea's hit "Let's Dance" with his favourite football team, Middlesbrough. The single reached No. 44 in the UK Singles Chart.
 In 1996–97, Mortimer appeared on an episode of Mash and Peas with Matt Lucas, David Walliams and Reece Shearsmith, in a sketch spoofing Seinfeld, called I'm Bland... yet all my friends are krazy!.
Mortimer voiced the computer-animated bulldog in adverts for Churchill Insurance. Churchill's "Oh, yes!" catchphrase is believed to be an impersonation of Potter the Janitor (played by Deryck Guyler) from the television series of the 1970s, Please Sir!. Older adverts had Mortimer's voice responding to questions posed by his comedy partner, Vic Reeves. In April 2005, however, Reeves was removed from the adverts, after he was convicted of drink-driving.
 In July 2002, Mortimer fought and defeated Les Dennis in the BBC's first Celebrity Boxing match, as part of Sport Relief 2002.
 In 2002, Mortimer presented the Channel 4 list show The 100 Greatest World Cup Moments of All Time! An updated show, again hosted by Mortimer, was broadcast by the channel in 2010, to coincide with the 2010 FIFA World Cup.
 Mortimer produced and presented the second match, The Fight, a year later, which saw Grant Bovey versus Ricky Gervais.
 In 2005, Mortimer hosted his first major TV series without Reeves, a comedy panel game for BBC One, called 29 Minutes of Fame, which featured regular guests such as Jo Brand.
 Also in 2005, Mortimer voiced the character of Father Nicholas in the animated BBC Three series Popetown. The show was not broadcast by the channel, for fear of offending Catholic viewers, though it saw a DVD release later that year.

 Mortimer co-wrote the BBC Three sketch comedy Tittybangbang with Jill Parker. The programme starred Lucy Montgomery and Debbie Chazen, with Tony Way, and ran for three series between 2006 and 2007.
 Mortimer appeared on BBC Two's Never Mind the Buzzcocks on four occasions – in 1996, on Sean Hughes' team; in 2000, on Phill Jupitus's team; in 2008, as a guest team captain; and in 2012, as a guest host.
 In April 2010, Mortimer appeared on the Sky1 panel show A League of Their Own, on Andrew Flintoff's team.
 Mortimer has been a regular guest panellist on the BBC1 quiz show Would I Lie to You? since 2012, having appeared in eleven episodes up to the 2022 series. He has since stated that his appearances on this show have given him more recognition than any of his previous work.
 In November 2013, Mortimer appeared on an episode of Ross Noble Freewheeling.
 Also in 2013, Mortimer played Frank in the E4 sitcom Drifters.
 On 18 June 2014, Mortimer appeared on an episode of the Dave show, Alan Davies: As Yet Untitled.
On 4 March 2015, he appeared in Let's Play Darts, but lost out to Roisin Conaty.
In 2015, he appeared in an episode of Celebrity Squares alongside Vic Reeves.
In April 2015, Mortimer took over from the late Rik Mayall as Bombardier Bedford, the mascot of Wells Bombardier Beer.
Since March 2016, Mortimer has co-hosted a regular podcast, Athletico Mince, alongside Andy Dawson.
Mortimer has appeared on numerous episodes of the Sky1 comedy panel game Duck Quacks Don't Echo, hosted by his regular Would I Lie to You? team captain, Lee Mack.
In 2017, Mortimer competed in and won series 5 of Taskmaster against Aisling Bea, Sally Phillips, Nish Kumar and Mark Watson. He then competed in the Taskmaster: Champion of Champions series against Noel Fielding, Josh Widdicombe, Katherine Ryan and Rob Beckett, coming last.
In June and July 2018, Mortimer teamed up with his longtime friend and fellow comedian, Paul Whitehouse, in a BBC2 six part comedy series, Mortimer & Whitehouse: Gone Fishing. The two friends, who have both suffered from heart conditions, shared their thoughts and experiences while fishing at a variety of locations around the UK. Five series of the programme have aired to date; a book was released in 2020, series 4 and a Christmas special aired in 2021.
On 3 February 2019, Mortimer appeared on the BBC Radio programme Desert Island Discs.
In 2019, Mortimer appeared on an episode of Channel 4's Travel Man with Richard Ayoade.
 Mortimer wrote The Satsuma Complex, a comic novel published in 2022. An audiobook was released, narrated by Mortimer and Sally Phillips.

Personal life 
Mortimer has suffered from rheumatoid arthritis since childhood, which gives him great pain when he is stressed, especially before making a television series or embarking on a tour. On those occasions, he controls it with steroids.

In October 2015, Mortimer underwent triple bypass surgery, which led to the cancellation of the first leg of the Reeves and Mortimer 25 years tour. Half an hour before the surgery, he married Lisa Matthews, his girlfriend of 22 years. They have two sons named Harry and Tom.

Mortimer is a lifelong fan of his hometown football team Middlesbrough FC and the rock band Free. During his appearance on Desert Island Discs, he revealed that he dealt with crippling shyness until the age of 30, which only began to improve after his initial television success; he also reflected on how his father's early death had shaped his personality, despite not realising how much this event had affected him as a child.

In September 2021, Mortimer released an autobiography titled And Away....

References

External links 
 

1959 births
Alumni of the University of Leicester
Alumni of the University of Sussex
Comedians from Yorkshire
English male comedians
English solicitors
English television presenters
Living people
People from Middlesbrough
English autobiographers